Severfield plc is a North Yorkshire based structural steel contractor. By turnover it is the largest in the UK, and amongst the biggest in Europe, with a capacity of 165,000 tons per year. Landmark works include London's 2012 Olympic Stadium, The Shard, Wimbledon Centre Court roof, Emirates Stadium and Paris Philharmonic Hall.

The firm has acquired businesses across structural steel market sectors within the UK and participates with JSW Group in two Mumbai based joint ventures, JSW Severfield Structures Ltd and indirectly, JSW Structural Metal Decking Ltd.

History

The business was founded in 1978 as a partnership named Severfield-Reeve; moved to Dalton in 1980, and incorporated as Severfield Reeve Structural Engineers Ltd in 1983. As a public company it was known from 1988 to 1999 as Severfield-Reeve plc; from 1999 to 2014 as Severfield-Rowen plc, and then adopted its current title.

Listings
In July 1988, Severfield-Reeve plc was quoted on the Unlisted Securities Market, then moved up to the London Stock Exchange on 8 June 1995.

, Severfield plc is a component of the FTSE SmallCap Index.

Acquisitions and new businesses

(UK) Steel and UK Steel

In 1991, Severfield Reeve acquired 80% of steel trading business, Steel (UK) Ltd  and bought out the remaining minority shareholdings in 2009. The company ceased trading in 2002; was renamed Stable Move Ltd in 2005, and dissolved in 2013 owing £1,161,732 to Severfield plc and eliminating shareholder value.

In 2006, Severfield established Steel UK Ltd as a 50% joint venture with Sheffield based steel stockholder Murray Metals Group Ltd to negotiate steel purchase prices for both partners. The company had been incorporated in 2005 as Stable Move Ltd. Severfield and Murray bought steel at prices agreed with suppliers by Steel UK and the company did not trade itself. The joint venture was dissolved in 2013.

Meat processing equipment

In 1995, Severfield's meat processing safety equipment subsidiary Manabo (UK) Ltd began trading. Initially the business was a 75% joint venture with the original technology developer but in 1996, Severfield Reeve bought out all remaining minority shareholdings. The established Scandinavian distributor for Manabo's products agreed to purchase from the new company. Manabo manufactured at sites around Thirsk and, from 1997, operated a chain mail glove factory in Bataszek, Hungary.

Such was the anticipated transformation of the structural steel business that by 1997, The Times described Severfield as a specialist engineer and supplier of equipment for the meat and poultry processing industry. However, in the same year company founder John Severs blamed Manabo's six monthly £902,000 losses on the meat industry being reluctant to change its ways in health and hygiene.The glove business and company were sold in 2000 after a further £2 million loss in 1998, and asset write-down of £2.8 million in 1999.

Severfield Reeve Projects Ltd

In 1991, subsidiary Severfield Reeve Projects Ltd was incorporated, initially to carry out construction at Severfield's plants. It began to undertake main contracting for others in 1997.

Severfield Reeve Projects diversified into house building in 2002, purchasing on its own account a site in Bagby for two traditional, five bedroom dwellings with  gardens.

In 2008, it launched a property investment division with the purchase of distribution warehouses for £7.1 million. The value of the initial investments was written down by £2.1 million in 2009. New projects and investments by Severfield Reeve Projects Ltd stopped in 2009, and it closed in 2011.

Kennedy Watts Partnership Ltd

In 1999, Severfield purchased 25.1% of Sheffield based design bureau Kennedy Watts Partnership Ltd for £464,000 in shares and cash. The shareholding was restructured in 2008 so that it was held through an intermediary, Last Exit Ltd. Kennedy Watts Partnership Ltd was placed into administration in 2013; into liquidation in 2014, and dissolved in 2016 with a deficit to creditors of £292,000 and elimination of all shareholder stakes.

Work platform

In 2006, Severfield patented a craned or self climbing work platform that attaches to steelwork at height, and mounts its own powered cherry picker. The apparatus was invented to assist erection of steel structures where conditions are not suitable for safe operation of conventional access equipment. In 2009, the work platform project was abandoned and £2.4 million development costs written off.

Tonnage

Severfield structural, fabricated steel output, relative to capacity and UK market:

, the JSW Severfield Structures Ltd joint venture in India has a capacity of 100,000 tons of fabricated steel per annum.

Locations

Severfield plc is headquartered on the former RAF Dalton near Thirsk and is a significant employer there. It also has sites in Sherburn, Lostock, Bolton, Bridlington, Ballinamallard, and European offices at Zevenbergen.

Joint ventures JSW Severfield Structures Ltd and JSW Structural Metal Decking Ltd are located in Mumbai.

The Construction Metal Forming Ltd cold formed construction steel joint venture manufactures steel decking, and light gauge framing, in Mamhilad and Magor.

Safety

Accident statistics
Severfield plc's RIDDOR ratios have improved, and are lower than its industry average. Senior executives are remunerated according to the accident frequency rate of the business units they oversee.

Site fall denied

In January 2021, a steel erector employed by Severfield fell down a staircase at Google's Kings Cross site and was unfit to work for six days. Severfield suspected fraud and summarily dismissed him, but an Employment Tribunal determined the incident occurred; that the employee was unfairly dismissed, and awarded £2,721 in compensation. There was no order for payment in lieu of notice because, post dismissal, the erector took immediate, better remunerated employment elsewhere.

Hazardous welding fumes

In March 2020, Severfield was served a Health and Safety Executive Improvement Notice, because of hazardous welding fumes at its Lostock works. The fault was corrected by April 2020.

Lifting chain failure

In 2019, a link weld in the chain set being used to lift a 2.5 ton beam failed, although rated to over twice that capacity. The lifting equipment had recently been independently inspected. Similar sets from the Turkey based manufacturer were withdrawn from use and allegedly exhibited faulty welds. The beam was partially bolted in place so did not fall.

Damage to Leadenhall Tower

During 2017 redevelopment of 22 Bishopsgate, a suspended girder struck Leadenhall Tower. Severfield was the steel frame subcontractor to Multiplex's Bishopsgate site. Nobody was hurt.

Hand tool vibration

In November 2017, Severfield was served a Health and Safety Executive Improvement Notice, because of tools causing excessive hand arm vibrations, at its Dalton site. New working practices were applied by March 2018.

Forklift driver fatality

In 2016, the Health and Safety Executive fined the firm £135,000, plus £46,020 costs following a 2013 incident when a 27 year old forklift driver was fatally crushed at its Dalton site.

Site unloading

In 2015, Severfield and its haulage contractors adopted customised trailers for delivering fabricated steel to construction sites. They are fitted with exclusion barriers to prevent unauthorised access whilst unloading by forklift, and fall arrest equipment to protect riggers on the trailer when unloading by crane.

Leadenhall Tower bolts

In November 2014, two embrittled bolts, purchased from a supplier, broke and fell from Leadenhall Tower. Another descended in January 2015. Severfield announced an anticipated £6 million charge for bolt remediation works in 2015, and final settlement in 2019.

Faulty crane plate clamp

In 2012, Severfield settled the claim from a welder who had been moving steelwork with a crane and faulty plate clamp. A ten foot long, and two foot wide, beam fell and crushed his foot.

White finger

In 2011, a plater at Severfield's Dalton facility suffered permanent damage to his hands caused by vibrating tools provided by the firm. He developed hand arm vibration syndrome commonly known as  white finger.

Clyde Arc Bridge

Severfield subsidiary Watson Steel Structures Ltd fabricated the Clyde Arc Bridge in 2007. It had to be closed in 2008 because a clevis connector failed and a 35 metre long tension bar fell onto the carriageway. Another clevis was found to be cracked and it was decided to replace all 14 tension bars in the structure. Watson Steel Structures Ltd claimed £1.8 million from Macalloy, the clevis supplier, alleging its product was faulty. Macalloy denied the claim and countered Watson Steel Structures Ltd had only specified minimum yield stress for the components.

Epoxy resin paint

In 2005 Severfield dismissed a painter, at its newly acquired Sherburn site, who suffered allergic industrial contact dermatitis following exposure to epoxy resin paint. He claimed compensation. Severfield initially denied, but then accepted responsibility just before the 2007 High Court hearing. Mr Recorder Salter went on to award the painter £113,168.15 damages including £50,000 for loss of future earnings. The firm appealed but in 2008, Lord Justice Keene's judgement rejected its arguments and increased the award for future earnings loss to £90,000.

Waltham Abbey fall

In 2002, a 29 year old steel fixer working for Severfield's Steelcraft Erection Services Ltd fell from a new Sainsbury's distribution centre, and suffered spinal injuries; broken ribs, and a punctured lung.

Project gallery

Controversies

Blyth battery plant

The Guardian reported in September 2022 that Severfield had been impacted by cancelled and delayed works at Britishvolt's challenged Blyth gigafactory. It declined comment to the newspaper.

Manchester Ship Canal

In 2022, Severfield issued a legal claim against Davymarkham Ltd relating to 2015 bridgeworks over the Manchester Ship Canal. Davymarkham Ltd had been dissolved in 2021, but was restored by court order to face proceedings alongside its insurers and Fairfield Engineering Solutions Ltd.

Late supplier payments

In July 2019, subsidiary Severfield Design and Build Ltd was suspended from the UK Government's Prompt Payment Code for failing to pay suppliers on time. The firm submitted an action plan to the Chartered Institute of Credit Management and was reinstated by November 2019.

Carrington Power Station

In 2013, Severfield contracted with the Duro Felguera group to provide steelwork for the new Carrington Power Station. Duro Felguera's UK subsidiary refused to pay a December 2014 stage payment. Severfield obtained adjudication under the Housing Grants, Construction and Regeneration Act 1996 for £2,470,231.97, and then sought summary judgement from the High Court of Justice to enforce payment for a reduced amount of £1,445,495.78. Judge Stuart-Smith refused because part of the sum related to a power plant and was therefore excluded from the 1996 Act, and the adjudicator's jurisdiction. Duro Felguera argued it was in fact owed money by Severfield because of overpayments.

Severfield finally obtained a judgement from Mr Justice Coulson in 2017 for £2,774,077.91 (or £1,760,480.27 up to 2014) but by then Duro Felguera UK Ltd had entered liquidation and recovery was limited to what Duro Felguera in Spain could be obliged to pay under a parent company guarantee for the period up to 2014.

Losses on Leadenhall Tower

During 2013, the group acknowledged substantial contractual losses in relation to Leadenhall Tower in the City of London. This prompted a major restructuring of the business; departure of the Chief Executive, and a £45m rights issue.

Severfield's 2012 accounts included a £9.9 million charge for losses at Leadenhall Tower, plus a further £10.2 million on other delinquent contracts.

Wimbledon roof leak

In 2011, the Daily Mirror alleged the retractable roof over Wimbledon Centre Court leaked during a quarter final tennis match. Severfield completed the 3,000 ton moving roof in 2009. The All England Club stated the leaks were in the permanent roof, not the mobile section, and were "part of the normal drainage process".

Discrimination by association

In 2011, Severfield decided to reduce the number of welders at its Sherburn site by selectively not renewing the contract of an employee who was caring for his disabled wife. He claimed discrimination by association. Severfield could not satisfy the employment tribunal there was any other reason for the dismissal and the welder was awarded £10,500 compensation with a recommendation he should be re-employed.

Remuneration of founder

Shareholders rebelled against a 2007 payment of £1.6 million to retiring Managing Director, John Severs. They refused to pass a resolution at AGM to authorise the payment which had already been made.

Property transactions

In 2001, directors of the company, including John Severs, purchased the headquarters property for £14 million. In 2007 the company bought it back again for £23.5 million. Both transactions were endorsed by the independent directors.

Fischer and Bartlett roof leaks

In 1989, a subsidiary of Georg Fischer AG built a distribution warehouse near Coventry. The shallow pitch roof leaked, exacerbated by deflection of supporting steelwork. It sued the builders and designer. Severfield-Reeve plc was the steelwork subcontractor and met specifications supplied to it by the designer. In 1994, Severfield-Reeve plc agreed to pay £175,000 to the building owner in return for an indemnity against all parties in the matter.

In 2009, Severfield became third party in a claim relating to the leaking roof at a potato processing plant in Airdrie constructed by its then subsidiary Atlas Ward Structures. Severfield agreed joint liability with the building's main contractors. Lord Menzies in the Outer House of the Court of Session was asked to choose between remediation options for the Airdrie premises, the alternatives differing in cost and quantum of damages. He drew attention to the similar decision that had faced Judge Hicks in the Fischer warehouse case.

See also

References

External links

1978 establishments in the United Kingdom
Companies based in Hambleton District
Construction and civil engineering companies established in 1978
Companies listed on the London Stock Exchange
Construction and civil engineering companies of the United Kingdom
Hambleton District
Steel companies of the United Kingdom
Structural steel
1978 establishments in England
Companies established in the 20th century